Luke Reynolds (born 9 July 1985) is an Australian professional volleyball coach. He currently serves as head coach for the University of Charleston men's volleyball team, Charleston Golden Eagles.

Reynolds started his coaching career in Canada after playing 4 seasons at the Brandon University. The coach then progressed to coaching professional in Europe at the young age of 27, taking over Svedala Volley in Sweden. Since then, Reynolds has worked his way through the European leagues, head coaching at most notably Berlin Recycling Volleys in the German Bundesliga and Jastrzębski Węgiel in the Polish PlusLiga. 

Reynolds also worked extensively as an assistant coach with the Australian Men's National team. Not only has he worked as a volleyball coach but he has ascertained his Level 2 ASCA Strength and Conditioning certification and specialised in working with professional and international volleyball teams.

Notable international and professional experiences 
 2021 21st AVC Asian Championships - AUS National Team, Tokyo, JPN 
 2021 NCAA National Championships- Pepperdine University 
 2020/21 CEV Champions League with Jastrzebski Wegiel - withdrew COVID
 2020 FIVB Tokyo Olympic Qualifications - AUS National Team - China 
 2019/20 CEV Champions League with Jastrzebski Wegiel - Qualified Semi Final vs Trentino - withdrew COVID 
 2019 FIVB International Olympic Qualifier - AUS National Team, Bari 
 2019 20th AVC Asian Championships, Tehran, IRN - Silver Medal 
 2019 FIVB VNL (Volleyball Nations League)- Australian National Team
 2019 FIVB World Cup, Tokyo, JPN 
 2018 FIVB VNL (Volleyball Nations League) - Australian National Team
 2018 FIVB World Championships - AUS National Team 
 2017/18 CEV Champions League with Berlin Recycling Volleys 
 2017 FIVB World League Final - Bronze Medal - 
 2016/17 Jastrzebski Wegiel - Bronze Medal - Poland PlusLiga 
 2015/16 Cyprus League Cup - Silver Medal 
 2014 Swedish Elite Series (Women) Silver Medal 
 Swedish Elite Series Cup (Women) Silver Medal 
 2014 Swedish Gran Prix - Champions

Assistant coach to the following 
 2021 – Marcos Miranda 
 2020 – Slobodan Kovač 
 2019 – Roberto Santilli 
 2016 to 2020 – Mark Lebedew 
 2013 – Grant Wilson

References

External links
 
 Coach profile at Volleybox.net

1985 births
Living people
Sportspeople from Melbourne
Australian volleyball coaches
Volleyball coaches of international teams
Australian expatriate sportspeople in Canada
Australian expatriate sportspeople in Sweden
Australian expatriate sportspeople in Cyprus
Australian expatriate sportspeople in Poland
Australian expatriate sportspeople in Germany
Australian expatriate sportspeople in the United States
Jastrzębski Węgiel coaches